Esther Smith is an English actress best known for her work in the television series Uncle, Cuckoo and Trying. She is also known for originating the role of Delphi Diggory in the play Harry Potter and the Cursed Child.

Early life
Smith was raised in Stourbridge, West Midlands. Her parents are teachers, and she has a sister, Rachel. Smith began dancing when she was three and was active in her local pantomime company. She studied ballet and contemporary dance at King Edward VI College in Stourbridge, where she began acting, before moving to the Guildford School of Acting at the urging of a teacher.

Career
Shortly after leaving drama school, Smith rose to prominence in 2010 for her role as Trish in Material Girl. She has since had guest appearances on Skins and The Midnight Beast.

In 2014, she replaced Tamla Kari as Rachel for the second series of Cuckoo on BBC Three. She also starred in the ITV2 comedy Cockroaches and had a recurring role on another BBC Three sitcom, Uncle, as Melodie.

In April 2015, Smith starred in Channel 4 show Ballot Monkeys, as assistant to the Liberal Democrats candidate. In February 2016, she appeared in Siblings as Holly, an old flame of Dan's from Circus School.

She was part of the original cast of Harry Potter play Harry Potter and the Cursed Child, portraying Delphi Diggory. In October 2017 she appeared in Parliament Square as Kat at the Royal Exchange, Manchester.

In May 2020, Smith began appearing in Apple TV+ original Trying in the lead role of Nikki. Season 2 premiered on 21 May 2021. Season 3 premiered on 22 July 2022.

Filmography

Television

Film

Theatre credits

References

External links

21st-century English actresses
English television actresses
Living people
People from Stourbridge
1980s births
English film actresses
English stage actresses